Éamonn O'Doherty may refer to:

 Éamonn O'Doherty (republican) (1939–1999), Irish republican
 Éamonn O'Doherty (sculptor) (1939–2011), Irish sculptor